Zafar Iqbal is an English physician who is the Head of Sports Medicine of Crystal Palace.

Early life

Born in Pakistan, Iqbal and his parents eventually settled in Rochdale, England, where he grew up. Iqbal started thinking of becoming a physician at the age of 10, after his sister suffered cancer. He started studying sports medicine after suffering an injury playing football.

Career

Iqbal has worked as a physician for English sides Leyton Orient, Tottenham, Liverpool, and Crystal Palace.

Personal life

He is married and has 3 children.

References

Crystal Palace F.C. non-playing staff
English people of Pakistani descent
Liverpool F.C. non-playing staff
Living people
Physicians
Tottenham Hotspur F.C. non-playing staff